Sir Manuel Richard Hornibrook OBE (7 August 1893 – 30 May 1970) was an Australian builder and civil engineer. He founded the firm M R Hornibrook Pty Ltd that after merger with Baulderstone became one of the largest Australian civil engineering firms.  Known as "MR", Hornibrook was knighted in 1960. He was highly respected and a builder of bridges across Queensland, New South Wales, Victoria, South Australia and Papua New Guinea as well as other major projects including Stages 2 (the Sails) and 3 of the Sydney Opera House.

Early life 
As one of seven children of Catherine Hornibrook, Manuel was educated at Nambour, Obi Obi, Bowen Bridge and South Brisbane state schools.

Building (and engineering) career 

At the age of 13 Hornibrook commenced apprenticeship with builder HW Fooks. In 1912, at the age of 19, Manuel with his brother Reginald established their own business, which started with building drainage channels and sewerage systems. Soon the bridge building became Hornibrook's speciality.

The business quickly moved into civil engineering contracting, excavating the State's first open-cut coal mine at Blair Athol in 1923. The William Jolly Bridge built from 1930 to 1932 became his all-time favourite project because of the aesthetic appeal of the bridge and the pioneering use of the sand island method of pier construction.

In 1914 Hornibrook joined the Queensland Master Builders' Association and was its president in 1922 and 1923; he was president (1926) and a life member (1959) of the Master Builders Federation of Australia; he was also a foundation fellow (1951), councillor and National President (1952–56) of the Australian Institute of Builders (now Building), and a driving force in the construction of its headquarters at Milson's Point, Sydney. For his contribution to the science and the practice of building, he was awarded the A.I.B.'s first medal of merit (the AIB Medal, 1955). President (1953–59) of the Queensland Civil Engineering Contractors' Association, he was an honorary member (1968) of the Australian Federation of Civil Engineering Contractors and an honorary fellow (1969) of the Chartered Institute of Building (Britain)—the first Australian to be so honoured. He was appointed an Officer of the Order of the British Empire (OBE) in 1957 and knighted (as a Knight Bachelor) in 1960.

Sir Manuel Hornibrook was the Chief Engineer during construction of the Hornibrook Bridge which was named after him. He was also responsible for building Brisbane's Story Bridge and William Jolly Bridge. One of Hornibrook's most challenging projects was building the immensely complex roof shells of the Sydney Opera House, turning architect Jorn Utzon's dream into reality. 

Sir Manuel was posthumously inducted into the Queensland Business Leaders Hall of Fame in 2016.

References
Australian Dictionary of Biography

Publications
  Queensland 150 Years of Achievement, 2009, Kay Saunders,

External links

 Sir Manuel Richard Hornibrook at Australian Dictionary of Biography
 Baulderstone
Sir Manuel Hornibrook digital story and oral history: Queensland Business Leaders Hall of Fame 2016, State Library of Queensland
2015 Queensland Business Leaders Hall of Fame Fellow: Julie Hornibrook
Hornibrook: building bridges connects Brisbane - State Library of Queensland
Archives reveal more history of Hornibrook innovation in the building of Sydney Opera House., 2021, Julie Hornibrook, John Oxley Library Blog, State Library of Queensland.

1893 births
1970 deaths
Australian civil engineers
Bridge engineers
Australian Knights Bachelor
Australian Officers of the Order of the British Empire